Abdullahi Bagudu Mamman, fss, psc, mni (21 July 1941) is a retired Nigerian army major general, politician and traditional leader who served in two ministerial positions, Technology and the Internal affairs.

Background and career 
Born in Abaji, now present in Abuja. He started his education at Native Authority Primary School in 1947, then he attend Kwara senior primary school Ugu-Beku from 1950 to 1957 and went to Provincial secondary school in Okene finished 1962.

He enrolled in Nigeria Military Training College, Kaduna in 1964 and Royal Military Academy Sandhurst, United Kingdom in 1964 to 1965, then in 1968 he attended the Royal School of Artillery, United Kingdom, Odessa Military College in 1970, he later joined the Command and Staff College, Kaduna in 1976 for his senior military course and hold diploma in National Institute for Policy and Strategic Studies, Jos later in 2001 he was award Ph'D.

He command 32 field artillery regiment of Nigerian Army in 1970 and brigade command school of artillery in 1975 - 1979, chief military personnel officer, United Nation Interim Force Lebanon in 1981, Commander Corps of Signal 1983 and School of Artillery Brigade. He was Army training and operations director in 1985 and was member of Armed Forces Ruling Council from 1985 - 1989 later in 1988 he was Commandant, Armed Force Command and Staff College, Jaji till 1990 there he retired and was appointed Minister. In 1993 he found the Hikma International Limited later he chairs the Administrative body in University of Nsukka 1995.

Notes 

Living people
1941 births
Nigerian Army officers
Nigerian military officers